Ofelia Ana Olivero is an Argentine-American biologist specialized in HIV/AIDS and biomedical research. She pioneered the discovery of nucleoside analogs induced centrosomal amplification and aneuploidy while working as a senior staff scientist at the National Cancer Institute (NCI). In 2016, she became chief of the NCI diversity intramural workforce branch.

Education 
Ofelia A. Olivero obtained her Ph.D. in cytogenetics from National University of La Plata.

Career and research 
In 1987, Olivero joined the National Cancer Institute (NCI) as a postdoctoral researcher. With her colleagues, she showed for the first time that the nucleoside analog used in the earliest AIDS therapy by pregnant women to prevent the vertical transmission of HIV from the mother to the fetus was a transplacental carcinogen in mice. Since then the insert of the drug AZT contained a paragraph indicating the danger to the unborn baby. She pioneered the discovery of nucleoside analogs induced centrosomal amplification and aneuploidy working as a senior staff scientist in the Laboratory of Cancer Biology and Genetics at the NCI. She is the author and co-author of more than 75 scientific articles, book chapters and her book entitled, Interdisciplinary Mentoring in Science: Strategies for Success (2013). In her book, she describes what successful mentoring is, what it is not, and how these important concepts relate to scientists today.

In 2016, Olivero became chief of the diversity intramural workforce branch (IDWB) where she led efforts of NCI to increase diversity in the workforce.

Olivero has been an active member of the National Institutes of Health (NIH) SACNAS Chapter, the NIH and HHS Hispanic Employee Organization (HEO), and a long-standing member of the American Association for Cancer Research, where she participates in their minority and women in cancer research special groups. For three years, she was engaged as an active member and advisor to the NIH Hispanic Employment Committee (HEC) where she advocated for equity, diversity and inclusion and helped lead numerous activities to attract Hispanics and Latinos in science to the NIH. An advocate of equal rights, Olivero has stood up for fairness, with firm recommendations at various diversity and inclusion panels. As a member of the NIH OHR Scientific Minority Recruitment Forum (SMRF), she has supported their recruitment activities meeting and conveying the excitement of science with students from underrepresented backgrounds in conferences and special events. Olivero was an active member of the NIH Hispanic and Latino Committee (HLEC) sponsored by NIH Office of Equality Diversity and Inclusion (EDI), and an advisor at various chief officer for scientific workforce diversity (COSWD) scientific recruitment and careers subcommittees. She was involved with the NIH Hispanic Research Special Interest Group, where she helped them establish a new mentoring venue for the NIH.

Awards and honors 
Olivero aimed to empower and inspire young females to choose scientific careers and was selected by the United States Department of State to be part of a delegation of female scientists to visit Brazil and Colombia to favor the participation of women in science. Olivero is the recipient of the Leading Diversity Award given by the NCI Director in appreciation of efforts furthering diversity and equal employment opportunity. She has received a mentor award from AWIS in the year 2013 because of her commitment to mentoring young minority females a mentoring award from the NCI in 2016 and was recognized as a “Game Changer” from the EDI office.

Selected works

Books

Journal articles

References 

Living people
Place of birth missing (living people)
Year of birth missing (living people)
20th-century births
National University of La Plata alumni
Argentine emigrants to the United States
National Institutes of Health people
HIV/AIDS researchers
Women medical researchers
Argentine medical researchers
American medical researchers
20th-century American women scientists
21st-century American women scientists
20th-century American biologists
21st-century American biologists
20th-century Argentine scientists
21st-century Argentine scientists
Hispanic and Latino American scientists